Batticaloa railway station is a railway station in the city of Batticaloa in eastern Sri Lanka. Owned by Sri Lanka Railways, the state-owned railway operator, the station is part of the Batticaloa line which links Batticaloa District with the capital Colombo.

Services

See also
 List of railway stations in Sri Lanka
 List of railway stations in Sri Lanka by line

Railway station
Railway stations on the Batticaloa Line